The blackish pewee (Contopus nigrescens) is a species of bird in the family Tyrannidae. It is found in Brazil, Ecuador, Guyana, and Peru.

Its natural habitats are subtropical or tropical moist lowland forests and subtropical or tropical moist montane forests.

References

blackish pewee
Birds of Brazil
Birds of Ecuador
Birds of Peru
blackish pewee
blackish pewee
blackish pewee
Taxonomy articles created by Polbot